The 1958 All-Big Ten Conference football team consists of American football players chosen by various organizations for All-Big Ten Conference teams for the 1958 Big Ten Conference football season.

All-Big Ten selections

Quarterbacks
 Randy Duncan, Iowa (AP-1; UPI-1)
 Dale Hackbart, Wisconsin (AP-2; UPI-2)
 Dick Thornton, Northwestern (AP-3; UPI-3)

Halfbacks
 Ron Burton, Northwestern (AP-1; UPI-1)
 Willie Fleming, Iowa (AP-1; UPI-3)
 Don Clark, Ohio State (AP-2; UPI-1)
 Dean Look, Michigan State (AP-3; UPI-2)
 Bob Ptacek, Michigan (UPI-2)
 Ray Jauch, Iowa (AP-2; UPI-3)
 Ted Smith, Indiana (AP-3)

Fullbacks
 Bob White, Ohio State (AP-1; UPI-1)
 Bob Jarus, Purdue (AP-2; UPI-2)
 Don Horn, Iowa (UPI-3)
 John Hobbs, Wisconsin (AP-3)

Ends
 Rich Kreitling, Illinois (AP-1; UPI-1)
 Jim Houston, Ohio State (AP-1; UPI-2)
 Sam Williams, Michigan State (AP-2; UPI-1)
 Tom Franckhauser, Purdue (AP-2; UPI-2)
 Curt Merz, Iowa (AP-3; UPI-3)
 Gary Prahst, Michigan (UPI-3)
 Dave Kocourek, Wisconsin (UPI-3)

Tackles
 Gene Selawski, Purdue (AP-1; UPI-1)
 Andy Cvercko, Northwestern (AP-1; UPI-3)
 Jim Marshall, Ohio State (AP-2; UPI-1)
 Jim Heineke, Wisconsin (AP-2; UPI-2)
 Dan Lanphear, Wisconsin (UPI-2)
 John Burroughs, Iowa (UPI-3)
 Gene Gossage, Northwestern (AP-3)
 George Genyk, Michigan (AP-3)

Guards
 Ron Maltony, Purdue (AP-1; UPI-2)
 Jerry Stalcup, Wisconsin (AP-1; UPI-2)
 Bill Burrell, Illinois (AP-2; UPI-1)
 Ellison Kelly, Michigan State (UPI-1)
 Gary Grouwinkel, Iowa (AP-3; UPI-3)
 Mike Rabold, Indiana (AP-2; UPI-3)
 Bill Kerr, Indiana (AP-3)

Centers
 Dick Teteak, Wisconsin (AP-1; UPI-3)
 Mike Svendsen, Minnesota (AP-2; UPI-1)
 Jim Andreotti, Northwestern (AP-3; UPI-2)

Key
AP = Associated Press

UPI = United Press International, selected by the conference coaches

Bold = Consensus first-team selection of both the AP and UPI

See also
1958 College Football All-America Team

References

All-Big Ten Conference
All-Big Ten Conference football teams